Chungus may refer to:

 "Chungus", a neologism associated with British-American video game commentator Jim Sterling
 Big Chungus, an internet meme inspired by the cartoon Wabbit Twouble

See also
 Chungu (disambiguation)